Ranslet is a surname. Notable people with the surname include:

Arne Ranslet (1931–2018), Danish sculptor and ceramist
Pia Ranslet (born 1956), Danish painter and sculptor
Tulla Blomberg Ranslet (born 1928), Norwegian painter and sculptor

See also
Ransley